Prensa Libre was a newspaper published by Sergio Carbó in Havana, Cuba, from 1941 to 1960.

Other publications
When Prensa Libre wrote critically about the suppression of Diario de la Marina and the imminent loss of freedom of the press in Cuba, it too was seized by the government. Revolutionary mobs, incited by the frenzy of the moment, calling for execution of all the editors who opposed Castro and his Revolution.  One by one, Cuban newspapers ceased publication. Only government-controlled publications, like Revolución, El Mundo, Bohemia, and the communist Hoy were allowed to publish but even they were eventually phased out. After the firm establishment of the regime and the supremacy of the Communist Party, only Granma the official organ of the Cuban Communist Party, was allowed to exist.

References

External links
Prensa Libre available as Open Access in the Digital Library of the Caribbean, from the collections at the National Library José Martí
Holdings of Prensa Libre at the Library of Congress

Newspapers published in Cuba
Publications established in 1941
Spanish-language newspapers